Scythris pollicella is a moth of the family Scythrididae. It was described by Bengt Å. Bengtsson in 2002. It is found in Oman and Yemen.

The wingspan is 10–11.5 mm. The head, labial palpi, antennae, collar, tegulae, thorax, legs and forewings are beige or bone coloured, the antennae with rather long cilia. The hindwings are pale fuscous.

Etymology
The species name refers to the thumb-shaped extension of the valve and is derived from Latin pollex (meaning thumb).

References

pollicella
Moths described in 2002